Sir Alexander Richardson (27 March 1864 – 30 March 1928) was Conservative MP for Gravesend.

Before becoming an MP, he was a journalist and editor who specialised in engineering subjects. He was a long-time editor of Engineering magazine. He also wrote numerous historical works about engineering and engineering firm histories.

He was first elected at a by-election in 1918 during the war, was re-elected in the general elections of 1918 and 1922, but lost the seat to Labour in 1923. He was knighted in 1922.

Sources

Conservative Party (UK) MPs for English constituencies
1864 births
1928 deaths
People from Dumbarton
British editors
British non-fiction writers
British engineers